Vesa Hakala (born 5 December 1968, in Harjavalta) is a Finnish former ski jumper who competed from 1986 to 1994. He won a silver medal in the team large hill at the 1991 FIS Nordic World Ski Championships in Val di Fiemme and finished 12th in the individual normal hill at the 1993 championships.

Hakala's best individual career finish was third in the individual large hill in Sapporo in 1990.

External links

1968 births
Living people
People from Harjavalta
Finnish male ski jumpers
FIS Nordic World Ski Championships medalists in ski jumping
Sportspeople from Satakunta
20th-century Finnish people